The 2010 European Amateur Team Championship took place 6–10 July at Österåker Golf Club in Åkersberga, Sweden. It was the 28th men's golf European Amateur Team Championship.

Venue 

The club was founded in 1988 and its Västerled course, opened the same year, was co-designed by Sven Tumba and Jan Sederholm and located 20 kilometres northeast of Stockholm, Sweden.

The championship course was set up with par 72.

Format 
Each team consisted of 6 players, playing two rounds of stroke-play over two days, counting the five best scores each day for each team.

The eight best teams formed flight A, in knock-out match-play over the next three days. The teams were seeded based on their positions after the stroke play. The first placed team were drawn to play the quarter final against the eight placed team, the second against the seventh, the third against the sixth and the fourth against the fifth. Teams were allowed to use six players during the team matches, selecting four of them in the two morning foursome games and five players in to the afternoon single games. Teams knocked out after the quarter finals were allowed to play one foursome game and four single games in each of their remaining matches. Games all square at the 18th hole were declared halved, if the team match was already decided.

The eight teams placed 9–16 in the qualification stroke-play formed flight B, to play similar knock-out play, with one foursome game and four single games in each match, to decide their final positions.

The four teams placed 17–20 formed flight C, to play each other in a round-robin system, with one foursome game and four single games in each match, to decide their final positions.

Teams 
20 nation teams contested the event, the same number of teams as at the previous event one year earlier. Slovakia took part for the first time. Each team consisted of six players.

Players in the leading teams

Other participating teams

Winners 
Tied leaders of the opening 36-hole competition were team Denmark and team Italy, each with a 1-over-par score of 721. Denmark earned first place on the tie breaking better non-counting scores. Host nation Sweden, tied 14th after the first round, was close to miss the quarter finals, but finally, by a single stroke, took the last place among the top eight, ahead of three teams. Sweden eventually came close to winning the championship. Defending champions Scotland were among the teams which finished one stroke from qualifying for the quarter finals.

There was no official award for the lowest individual score, but  individual leader was Nino Bertasio, Italy, with a 10-under-par score of 134, four strokes ahead of Morten Ørum Madsen, Denmark.

Team England won the gold medal, earning their tenth title, beating team Sweden in the final 4–2.

Team Italy, earned the bronze on third place, after beating Spain 5–2 in the bronze match.

Results 
Qualification round

Team standings

* Note: In the event of a tie the order was determined by the best total of the two non-counting scores of the two rounds.

Individual leaders

 Note: There was no official award for the lowest individual score.

Flight A

Bracket

Final games

* Note: Game declared halved, since team match already decided.

Flight B

Bracket

Flight C

First round

Second round

Third round

Final standings

Sources:

See also 
 European Golf Association – Organizer of European amateur golf championships
 Eisenhower Trophy – biennial world amateur team golf championship for men organized by the International Golf Federation.
 European Ladies' Team Championship – European amateur team golf championship for women organised by the European Golf Association.

References

External links 
 European Golf Association: Full results

European Amateur Team Championship
Golf tournaments in Sweden
European Amateur Team Championship
European Amateur Team Championship
European Amateur Team Championship